Hagemeister Island is an uninhabited island in the U.S. state of Alaska, located on the north shore of Bristol Bay at the entrance to Togiak Bay.

It has no permanent population at the 2000 census.

It is named for Russian Captain Leonty Andrianovich Gagemeister (IRN), who commanded three voyages to Russian America and around the world. On the Neva in 1806–07, on the Kutuzov in 1816–19, and in 1828–30 on the Krothoy. The name was published as "Ostrov Gagemeister" by Lt. Sarichev (1826, map 3).

The island is part of the Bering Sea unit of the Alaska Maritime National Wildlife Refuge.

References
 Hagemeister Island: Block 3039, Census Tract 1, Dillingham Census Area, Alaska United States Census Bureau
 

Islands of the Bering Sea
Islands of Alaska
Islands of Dillingham Census Area, Alaska
Alaska Maritime National Wildlife Refuge
Protected areas of Dillingham Census Area, Alaska
Islands of Unorganized Borough, Alaska